Darbhanga Junction, station code DBG, is the primary railway station serving the city of Darbhanga in the Darbhanga district in the Indian state of Bihar. The Darbhanga Junction railway station is connected to most of the major cities in India by the railway network.

Facilities
The major facilities available are separate air conditioned waiting lounge, free WiFi facility, IRCTC food court, Automatic Ticket Vending Machines etc.

Platforms 
There are five platforms in Darbhanga Junction. The platforms are interconnected with foot overbridges (FOB),Escalator stairs & Lifts.

Trains
Darbhanga Junction railway station is a part of the East Central Railways located on the Samastipur rail route.  Some local passenger trains also run from Darbhanga Junction to neighbouring destinations like Raxaul, Jainagar, Sitamarhi and Samastipur on frequent intervals. The station is connected to most of the major cities in India.

Nearest airport
The nearest airport to Darbhanga Junction are
 Darbhanga Airport, Darbhanga
 Lok Nayak Jayaprakash Airport, Patna
 Gaya Airport, Gaya

See also

 Samastipur Junction
 Muzaffarpur Junction

Gallery

References

External links
 

Railway stations in Darbhanga district
Railway junction stations in Bihar
Samastipur railway division
Transport in Darbhanga
Railway stations opened in 1875
Indian Railway A1 Category Stations